Mercedes-Benz Fashion Week Tbilisi (MBFWT) is a Mercedes-Benz-sponsored Georgian fashion week in its capital city of Tbilisi. MBFWT was established in 2015. During the fashion week ARTGeorgia art exhibition and BENEXT international fashion design contest is also held.

Designers

Mercedes-Benz Fashion Week Tbilisi featured fashion designers such as Anouki, Avtandil, Lako Bukia, Tako Mekvabidze, among others.

References

External links

 

Fashion of Georgia (country)
Fashion events in Georgia (country)
Culture in Tbilisi
Recurring events established in 2015
2015 establishments in Georgia (country)
Fashion weeks